Hypsophila is a genus of moths of the family Noctuidae.

Species
 Hypsophila alpina
 Hypsophila haberhaueri
 Hypsophila jugorum
 Hypsophila klapperichi
 Hypsophila lunulata
 Hypsophila medialis
 Hypsophila meinhardti
 Hypsophila pamira
 Hypsophila postlimbalis
 Hypsophila tamerlana

References
Natural History Museum Lepidoptera genus database

Cuculliinae